This is a list of notable Turkish Austrians.

Academia
 Ednan Aslan, Professor of Islamic Religious Education at the University of Vienna
İlber Ortaylı, historian
Niyazi Serdar Sarıçiftçi, physicist
 , psychologist
Nermin Abadan Unat, sociologist

Arts and literature
 
 , writer and author
Şinasi Bozatlı, painter, sculptor and graphic artist
Seher Çakır, poet 
Nilbar Gures, artist
 , poet 
Esin Turan, painter and sculptor
 , Contemporary artist
Şerafettin Yıldız, writer and translator

Business 
 
Cevdet Caner, entrepreneur 
Attila Dogudan, founder of Do & Co
 Hikmet Ersek, CEO of Western Union
 , entrepreneur and the chairman of the Türkische Kulturgemeinde in Österreich

Cinema and television

 , actress and film director 
Turhan Bey, Hollywood actor 
 , actress 
 , actor 
 , film producer 
 , actor and model
Emel Heinreich, actress
Münire Inam, TV presenter 
 , actress 
 , actor and comedian
Aylin Kösetürk, winner of the second season of Austria's Next Topmodel
 , actor 
Yelda Reynaud, actress
 , actress
 , actor
 , actor

Fashion and design
Atıl Kutoğlu, fashion designer

Music

 , opera singer 
 , opera singer
 , singer
Ferhan Önder, pianist 
Ferzan Önder, pianist
Enes Özmen, from the duo hip-hop group EsRap
Esra Özmen, from the duo hip-hop group EsRap
 , jazz musician
 , music producer and DJ

Politics

 , member of the SPÖ 
Vahide Aydın, member and spokeswoman of the Green party
Adnan Dinçer, leader of the Turkish-Austrian founded party New Movement for the Future
 , former member of the Greens and the ÖVP
Hakan Gördü, founder of the Soziales Österreich der Zukunft (SÖZ) Party 
Alev Korun,  first Turkish congresswoman in the Austrian Parliament
 , member of the SPÖ
Mesut Onay, founding member of Alternative Liste Innsbruck 
 , member of the Greens
Turgay Taşkıran, founder of the Gemeinsam für Wien (GfW) Party 
Selma Yildirim, member of the National Council and deputy chairperson of the SPÖ
 , member of the SPÖ
 , member of the Greens

Religion
 , director of the professionally-oriented Islamic college for social education in Vienna
 , former President of the Islamic Faith Community in Austria (2016–2018)
 , former President of the Islamic Faith Community in Austria (2011–2016)

Sports

Şefik Abalı, football player 
Muhammed Akagündüz, football player
Volkan Akyıldız, football player 
Taner Ari, football player
Metin Aslan, football player
Cem Atan, football player
 , football player 
Furkan Aydogdu, football player
Ilter Ayyildiz, football player 
Onurhan Babuscu, football player 
Turgay Bahadır, football player
 , football player 
Ogulcan Bekar, football player 
Bülent Kaan Bilgen, football player
Ibrahim Bingöl, football player 
Osman Bozkurt, football player 
 , football player
 , football player
Tuncay Çalışkan, taekwondo practitioner
Serkan Çiftçi, football player 
Ekrem Dağ, football player 
Mahmut Demir, football player
Yusuf Demir, football player 
Mesut Doğan, futsal player 
Harun Erbek, football player
Kerim Frei, football player
Benjamin Fuchs, football player (Turkish mother and Austrian father)
Hakan Gökçek, football player 
Kürsat Güclü, football player 
 , football player 
Ali Hamdemir, football player
Tunç Hamarat, chess player
Melih İbrahimoğlu, football player 
Ahmed Ildiz, football player
Muhammed Ildiz, football player
Mahmud Imamoglu, football player 
Volkan Kahraman, football player
Ercan Kara, football player
Dursun Karatay, football player
Veli Kavlak, football player
 , football player
Tanju Kayhan, football player
 Can Keles, football player 
Eren Keles, football player 
Kenan Kirim, football player  	
Alfred König (1913-1987), Austrian-Turkish Olympic sprinter
Ümit Korkmaz, football player
Mert Müldür, football player 
 , football player
Ramazan Özcan, football player
Yasin Pehlivan, football player
İhsan Poyraz, football player
 , football player 
 , football player 
Yüksel Sariyar, football player
Murat Satin, football player 
Attila Sekerlioglu, football player
Tarkan Serbest, football player 
 , football player 
 , football player 
Dilan Yeşim Taşkın, women's football player 
 , football player 
Rami Tekir, football player 
Enes Tepecik, football player 
Murat Topal, futsal player
Cem Tosun, football player
Cemil Tosun, football player
Ertan Uyanık, futsal player
 , football player 
 , football player 
Mustafa Yavuz, football player 
 , football player 
Burak Yilmaz, football player 
 , football player
Kubilay Yilmaz, football player 
Okan Yilmaz, football player

See also 
Turks in Austria
List of Austrians

References

Austrian
Turkish
Turkish